The Jacob Bowman House is a historic house at 2470 Polk Road in rural south-central Shenandoah County, Virginia, southwest of Edinburg.  It is a two-story wood-frame structure, with a truncated hip roof and weatherboard siding.  It was built about 1840, and is a good early example of vernacular Greek Revival architecture in the county.  The property also includes a 19th-century bank barn and other outbuildings, as well as the remains of an early springhouse.

The house was listed on the National Register of Historic Places in 2017.

References

Houses on the National Register of Historic Places in Virginia
Greek Revival architecture in Virginia
Houses completed in 1840
Houses in Shenandoah County, Virginia
National Register of Historic Places in Shenandoah County, Virginia